James Byron may refer to:

James Byron (writer), wrote books on the List of Ace double novels
James Byron, singer on The Voice UK
Jim Byron, American 1950s and 1960s era publicist
James Paul Byron, ice hockey player

See also